Megachile anthophila is a species of bee in the family Megachilidae. It was described by Strand in 1913.

References

Anthophila
Insects described in 1913